Robin Arthur Woodland (born 1938), is a male former athlete who competed for England.

Athletics career
Woodland was selected by England to represent his country in athletics events. He was selected to represent Great Britain at the 1962 European Athletics Championships and the 1966 European Athletics Championships.

He also represented England in the 440 yard hurdles, just finishing outside the medals in fourth place, at the 1966 British Empire and Commonwealth Games in Kingston, Jamaica.

He was a member of the Hercules Athletics Club in Wimbledon.

References

1938 births
English male hurdlers
Athletes (track and field) at the 1966 British Empire and Commonwealth Games
Living people
Commonwealth Games competitors for England